Wojciech Fibak and Karl Meiler were the defending champions but did not compete that year.

Tom Okker and Marty Riessen won in the final 6–2, 6–2 against Fred McNair and Sherwood Stewart.

Seeds
Champion seeds are indicated in bold text while text in italics indicates the round in which those seeds were eliminated.

 Tom Okker /  Marty Riessen (champions)
 Fred McNair /  Sherwood Stewart (final)
 Stan Smith /  Erik van Dillen (first round)
 Eddie Dibbs /  Harold Solomon (first round)

Draw

External links
 1976 Paris Open Doubles draw

Doubles